Mathia is a village in the West Champaran district in the Indian state of Bihar.

Demographics
As of 2011 India census, Mathia had a population of 388 in 82 households. Males constitute 49.74% of the population and females 50.25%. Mathia has an average literacy rate of 25.51%, lower than the national average of 74%: male literacy is 53.5%, and female literacy is 46.4%. In Mathia, 19.32% of the population is under 6 years of age.

References

Villages in West Champaran district